Miroslav Škoro (born 29 July 1962) is a Croatian musician, television host and politician. He is the founder and the first president of the conservative Homeland Movement party, which he established in February 2020 and led until July 2021. As a musician, Škoro is best known for using the traditional Slavonian tamburica instrument in most of his compositions.

In the 2007 parliamentary election he was elected member of the Croatian Parliament for the Croatian Democratic Union party and held the office from January 2008 until his resignation in November of the same year. On 23 June 2019, he announced that he would contest the December presidential election as an independent candidate. He ended up finishing in third place with 24.45% of the vote – behind former prime minister Zoran Milanović (who ultimately won the election) and incumbent president Kolinda Grabar-Kitarović, and thus did not advance to the run-off in January 2020. On 29 February 2020, he announced that he would be forming, as well as personally chairing, a new political party called the Miroslav Škoro Homeland Movement, which contested the July 2020 parliamentary election as part of a wider coalition of conservative and right-wing parties. On 5 March 2021, Škoro launched a campaign to contest the 2021 Zagreb local elections, with himself as the Homeland Movement's candidate for mayor of Zagreb and with the party also presenting a candidate list for the Zagreb City Assembly (in a coalition with the Green List).

Early life
Born in Osijek, Škoro completed a civil engineering degree at the University of Osijek. He subsequently spent some time in the United States where he attended  the Community College of Allegheny County for two years. During his time in the United States, he co-wrote his first album Ne dirajte mi ravnicu with Pennsylvania native and tamburitza virtuoso Jerry Grcevich.

Music career
Škoro emerged onto the Croatian music scene with the debut album Ne dirajte mi ravnicu and produced a song of the same name which would go on to be one of the most famous Croatian songs. The tambura group Zlatni dukati released their own cover of the song that same year. In 2002, Škoro collaborated with Marko Perković on the song "Reci, brate moj" (Tell Me, My Brother). In the year after the collaboration was renewed in the single "Sude mi" ([They're] Putting Me on Trial), dedicated to retired Croatian general Ante Gotovina.

Between 2001 and 2006, Škoro was the chairman of the board of Croatia Records, the largest record company in Croatia.

In 2003, Škoro was a judge in Story Supernova Music Talents, a reality show aired on Nova TV, and performed his song "Mata" at the funeral of general Janko Bobetko. In 2004, his song "Milo moje" (My Sweet) won the Croatian Musicians Union's annual award for hit song. His 2005 album, Svetinja (Shrine), sold over 20,000 copies.

Political career

From 1995 to 1997, Škoro was the Croatian general consul to Hungary. 

On 30 October 2007, Škoro joined the Croatian Democratic Union, becoming a candidate on the 2007 parliamentary election and won seat in the parliament. Škoro took office on 11 January 2008, but resigned in November 2008 due to his disappointment over the way politicians were treated by Croatian media.

On 23 June 2019, Škoro announced his candidacy in the 2019–20 Croatian presidential election. In a video message on his Facebook page, Škoro said that changes to the Constitution are needed and that the president should have more powers. He came in third place with 24.45% of the vote and was eliminated from the second round. His campaign is supported by HKS, Hrast and Most.

On 29 February 2020, Škoro reported to the media the establishment of the new right-wing political party, the Miroslav Škoro Homeland Movement, four and a half months before the 2020 parliamentary election.

In March 2021, Škoro announced his candidacy for the mayor in the 2021 Zagreb local elections. He lost in the second round, gaining 34% of the vote, Tomislav Tomašević winning with 64%.

Music festival appearances
Festivals won are in bold.

Daleko je kuća moja, Herzegovinian Radio Festival, 2007
Šil, dil, daj, Croatian Radio Festival, 2007
Golubica, Zlatne žice Slavonije, 2005
Vrime, Split Festival, 2005
Svetinja, Croatian Radio Festival, 2005
Četri vitra, Split Festival, 2003
Milo moje, Croatian Radio Festival, 2003
Sve od Drave, pa do Jadrana, Zlatne Žice Požege, 2002
Reci, brate moj, MHJ, 2002
Dida, Etnofest Neum, 2001
Maria de la Lovrez, Croatian Radio Festival, 2001
Ptica samica, Etnofest Neum, 1999
Što te imam, moj živote, Croatian Radio Festival, 1999
Lako ćemo mi, Požega, 1998
Čovjek sunčani, MHJ, 1994

Discography
 Ne dirajte mi ravnicu (1992)
 Miroslav Škoro i Ravnica (1993)
 Sitan vez (1996)
 Miroslav Škoro, uživo (1998)
 Ptica samica (1999)
 Slagalica (2001)
 Milo moje (2003)
 Svetinja (2005)
 Sve najbolje (2007)
 Moje boje (2008)
 Čudnovate pjesmice o moru i lavoru (2013)
 Putujem sam (2014)
 Hrvatski Božić (2015)

References

External links

 
Miroslav Škoro at Discogs

1962 births
Living people
People from Osijek
Candidates for President of Croatia
20th-century Croatian male singers
Croatian pop singers
21st-century Croatian male singers
Representatives in the modern Croatian Parliament
University of Osijek alumni
Croatian Democratic Union politicians
Croatian nationalists